is a Japanese nordic combined skier who has competed since 2007. He skis with the Waseda University club. He has one FIS Nordic Combined World Cup podium from Oslo in season 2012–13 FIS Nordic Combined World Cup. His older brother Akito is one of the most successful athletes in nordic combined history.

External links
FIS profile

1991 births
Sportspeople from Nagano Prefecture
Japanese male Nordic combined skiers
Living people
Nordic combined skiers at the 2014 Winter Olympics
Nordic combined skiers at the 2018 Winter Olympics
Nordic combined skiers at the 2022 Winter Olympics
Olympic Nordic combined skiers of Japan
FIS Nordic World Ski Championships medalists in Nordic combined
Olympic bronze medalists for Japan
Olympic medalists in Nordic combined
Medalists at the 2022 Winter Olympics
21st-century Japanese people